Robert Dean Linder (October 6, 1933 - April 4, 2021) was an American historian, Distinguished Professor of history at the Department of History of the Kansas State University.

Robert D. Linder earned his B.S. from Kansas State Teachers College, his B.D. and M.R.E. from Central Baptist Theological Seminary, and his M.A. and Ph.D. from the University of Iowa.

Robert D. Linder was mayor of Manhattan, Kansas in 1971-1972.

Political views

Robert D. Linder is known for speaking out against war profiteering. With Richard Peirard and Robert Clouse, Linder edited two significant books that spoke against conservative evangelical politics generally and the Vietnam war specifically. "The immorality and corruption of the South Vietnamese government, combined with lessons from history about futility of waging a land war in Asia" convinced Linder that the war was both wrong and an "impossible situation".

Bibliography
Robert D Linder's publications include:

"Pierre Viret on War and Peace," Calvin Theological Journal; vol. 48 (June 2013): 122-130.
"Reformation Studies in the Early Twenty-First Century," Occasional Paper No. 6, The Australian College of Theology, September 2012, 1-16.
The Reformation Era (London: Greenwood Press, 2008).
Co-editor and contributor, Making History for God: Essays on Evangelicalism, Revival and Mission (Sydney: Robert Menzies College, 2004).
The History of the Church (rev. ed., London: Angus Hudson Ltd, 2002).
The Long Tragedy: Australian Evangelical Christians and the Great War, 1914-1918 (Adelaide: Openbook Publishers, 2000).
Co-editor, author of the Introduction and contributor, A Dictionary of Christianity in America(Chicago: IV Press, 1990).

References

External links
Robert D. Linder; k-state-edu

1933 births
2021 deaths
University of Iowa alumni
American anti–Vietnam War activists
Politicians from Manhattan, Kansas
Emporia State University alumni
Mayors of places in Kansas
Kansas State University faculty
Historians from Kansas